St. Helens is the county seat of Columbia County, Oregon. It was founded by Captain Henry Montgomery Knighton, a native of New England, in 1845, as "Plymouth". The city is about 28 miles (45 km) northwest of Portland. Its population was 12,883 at the 2010 census.

History
St. Helens was established as a river port on the Columbia River in the 1840s. The original town was surveyed and platted by Scottish-born Peter Crawford.  In 1853, the Pacific Mail Steamship Company tried to make the city their only stop on the Columbia River. Portland's merchants boycotted this effort, and the San Francisco steamship Peytona helped break the impasse. St. Helens was incorporated as a city in 1889.

The Lewis and Clark Expedition passed through and camped in the area that is now St. Helens on the night of November 5, 1805, while on their way to the Pacific Ocean.  While there, the party encountered Native Americans and Clark observed "low rockey clifts".

Geography
U.S. Route 30 passes through the city. It is located along the west bank of the Columbia River north of where Multnomah Channel enters it. Milton Creek flows through the town, entering Multnomah Channel via Scappoose Bay.

Climate
According to the Köppen climate classification system, St. Helens has a warm-summer Mediterranean climate Csb.

Neighborhoods
Columbia Heights is a formerly separate populated place that is within the city limits of St. Helens.

Demographics

2017 population estimate 
According to the Portland State University Population Research Center, the estimated 2017 population of St. Helens is 13,240.

2010 census
As of the census of 2010, there were 12,883 people, 4,847 households, and 3,243 families residing in the city. The racial makeup of the city was 90.3% White, 0.6% African American, 1.6% Native American, 1.3% Asian, 0.3% Pacific Islander, 1.3% from other races, and 4.5% from two or more races. Hispanic or Latino of any race were 6.1% of the population.

There were 4,847 households, of which 38.6% had children under the age of 18 living with them, 46.5% were married couples living together, 14.3% had a female householder with no husband present, 6.1% had a male householder with no wife present, and 33.1% were non-families. 26.1% of all households were made up of individuals, and 9.9% had someone living alone who was 65 years of age or older. The average household size was 2.59 and the average family size was 3.11.

The median age in the city was 34 years. 27.6% of residents were under the age of 18; 9% were between the ages of 18 and 24; 29.9% were from 25 to 44; 23.3% were from 45 to 64; and 10.2% were 65 years of age or older. The gender makeup of the city was 49.8% male and 50.2% female.

2000 census
As of the census of 2000, there were 10,019 people, 3,722 households, and 2,579 families residing in the city. The population density was 2,305.6 people per square mile (889.3/km). There were 4,032 housing units at an average density of 927.8 per square mile (357.9/km). The racial makeup of the city was 92.74% White, 0.34% African American, 1.68% Native American, 0.63% Asian, 0.15% Pacific Islander, 1.35% from other races, and 3.11% from two or more races. Hispanic or Latino of any race were 4.05% of the population. 21.5% were of German, 10.9% English, 9.5% Irish and 9.3% American ancestry according to Census 2000.

There were 3,722 households, out of which 39.3% had children under the age of 18 living with them, 51.5% were married couples living together, 12.6% had a female householder with no husband present, and 30.7% were non-families. 24.2% of all households were made up of individuals, and 7.9% had someone living alone who was 65 years of age or older. The average household size was 2.65 and the average family size was 3.12.

In the city, the population was spread out, with 30.2% under the age of 18, 9.0% from 18 to 24, 31.7% from 25 to 44, 19.6% from 45 to 64, and 9.6% who were 65 years of age or older. The median age was 32 years. For every 100 females, there were 98.9 males. For every 100 females age 18 and over, there were 96.2 males.

The median income for a household in the city was $40,648, and the median income for a family was $45,548. Males had a median income of $39,375 versus $26,725 for females. The per capita income for the city was $17,237. About 8.7% of families and 11.9% of the population were below the poverty line, including 16.5% of those under age 18 and 4.6% of those age 65 or over.

Tourism
In October, the town embraces the Halloween spirit with a month-long celebration of spooky events and decorations geared toward entertaining crowds of families. The Riverfront District in St. Helens, Oregon served as the backdrop for the 1998 Disney Channel Original Movie Halloweentown. The film adaptation of Stephenie Meyer's novel Twilight also filmed in the town.

Education
Public schools in St. Helens are served by the St. Helens School District.

Media
The Chronicle is St. Helens' weekly newspaper, published since 1881.

KOHI (AM) is St. Helens' local AM radio station.

Notable people

Robert Cornthwaite, actor
Holly Madison, Playboy model, reality TV personality on The Girls Next Door and Holly's World
Rob Mallicoat, baseball player
David Mayo, American football player
Frank A. Moore, Chief Justice of Oregon Supreme Court
Katee Sackhoff, actress
Chris Wakeland, baseball player

Sister city
St. Helens has one sister city:
  Bowral, New South Wales, Australia

See also
 Nob Hill Nature Park
 Port of St. Helens

References

External links

City of St. Helens (official website)
Entry for St. Helens in the Oregon Blue Book

 
Saint Helens
Cities in Columbia County, Oregon
County seats in Oregon
Port cities in Oregon
Oregon populated places on the Columbia River
1840s establishments in Oregon
Populated places established in 1845